The Sixth Dimension or Sixth Dimension may refer to:

 Six-dimensional space, a concept in mathematics and physics
 Sixth Dimension, a 2017 album by Power Quest
 The Sixth Dimension, a fictional place in the 1982 film Forbidden Zone
 The Sixth Dimension, a fictional place in the British-Canadian TV series Ace Lightning